Reinsberg is a municipality in the district of Mittelsachsen, in Saxony, Germany.

Notable people
Carl Victor Ryssel, theologian

References 

Mittelsachsen